Eberhard II von Otelingen (born 1100) was a German clergyman and bishop for the Roman Catholic Archdiocese of Bamberg. He became ordained in 1146. He was appointed bishop in 1146. He died in 1170.

References 

12th-century Roman Catholic bishops in Bavaria
1100 births
1170 deaths